The Subdivisions of Saudi Arabia, officially the Organization of the Kingdom of Saudi Arabia, as provided by the Regions' System, issued on 27 Sha'baan 1412 AH (civil calendar: 28 February 1992) by Royal Order A/92, amended by Royal Order No. A/21 on 30 Rabi' al-Awal 1414 AH, divided the Kingdom of Saudi Arabia into 13 emirates (provinces/regions); the 13 provinces further divided into 118 governorates, classified category (A) or category (B); the 118 governorates divided into a number of centers, category (A) and category (B), taking into consideration the housing, geographical, security, transport, environment and historic conditions of each region.

Provinces 
The Kingdom of Saudi Arabia is divided into 13 emirates or regions/provinces, each governed by a governor or emir, known as the Provincial Governor, to differentiate them from the governors of governorates. These are:

 the Emirate of the Riyadh Province
 the Emirate of the Makkah Province
 the Emirate of the Eastern Province
 the Emirate of the Madinah Province
 the Emirate of the Al Baha Province
 the Emirate of the Al Jawf Province
 the Emirate of the Northern Borders Province
 the Emirate of the Qassim Province
 the Emirate of the Ha'il Province
 the Emirate of the Tabuk Province
 the Emirate of the 'Aseer Province
 the Emirate of the Jizan Province
 the Emirate of the Najran Province

Governorates 
The 13 emirates are further divided into 118 governorates, each governed by a Governor. Of these, 13 are capital governorates governed by a Mayor.

See also

 Provinces of Saudi Arabia, the historical four provinces
 List of governorates of Saudi Arabia
 ISO 3166-2:SA, the ISO 3166-2 codes for the regions

References

 
Saudi Arabia